The 1994–95 season was the 83rd year of football played by Dundee United, and covers the period from July 1, 1994 to June 30, 1995. United finished in bottom place and were relegated to the First Division, their first spell outside the Premier Division since its inception in 1975.

Season review
United were relegated, the season after winning the Scottish Cup for the first time. Ivan Golac, the man who led them to the trophy, was sacked in March and replaced with Billy Kirkwood. Kirkwood's record was less than impressive and losing nine of the final eleven games meant relegation.

Match results
Dundee United played a total of 45 competitive matches during the 1994–95 season. The team finished tenth (bottom) in the Premier Division and were relegated.

In the cup competitions, United lost in the quarter-finals of the Tennent's Scottish Cup to Hearts and lost narrowly in the Coca-Cola Cup quarter-finals to Celtic.

Legend

All results are written with Dundee United's score first.

Premier Division

Tennent's Scottish Cup

Coca-Cola Cup

United beat Hamilton 5–3 on penalty kicks

Cup Winners' Cup

Player details
During the 1994–95 season, United used 25 different players comprising five nationalities. The table below shows the number of appearances and goals scored by each player.

|}

Goalscorers
United had 15 players score with the team scoring 56 goals in total. The top goalscorer was Jerren Nixon, who finished the season with 9 goals.

Discipline
Full disciplinary statistics are unavailable.

Team statistics

League table

Transfers

In
The club signed four players during the season and one at the end, for next season. Approximately £600k was spent on transfer fees.

Out
Five players were sold by the club during the season, with the club raising at least £750k in transfer sales, representing a small overall transfer profit.

* Cleland and Bollan were sold in a joint £750k deal

Playing kit

The jerseys were sponsored by Rover for the first time in a two-year deal. The deal began in time for the Cup Final at the end of the previous season.

Trivia
 Celtic, who relegated United on the final day by beating them, actually scored the lowest number of league goals that season (39). United scored 40.

See also
 1994–95 in Scottish football

References

External links
 Hibernian 5–0 United: The Scotsman classic match review
 Glenrothes Arabs 1994–95 season review

Dundee United F.C. seasons
Dundee United